Pittsburg may refer to:

Places

United States
Cities, towns, townships and counties
Pittsburg, California
Pittsburg, Florida
Pittsburg, Kansas, Crawford County
Pittsburg, New Hampshire
Pittsburg, Oklahoma
Pittsburg, Texas
Pittsburg County, Oklahoma
Pittsburg Township, Mitchell County, Kansas
Former spelling of Pittsburgh, Pennsylvania
South Pittsburg, Tennessee

Unincorporated communities, former towns, and other places
Pittsburg, Alabama
Pittsburg Point, Arizona, a village that predates and was absorbed by Lake Havasu City, Arizona
Pittsburg, Arkansas
Bay Point, California, until 1993 named West Pittsburg
Pittsburg, Colorado
Pittsburg, DeKalb County, Georgia
Pittsburg, Walker County, Georgia
Pittsburg, Fayette County, Illinois
Pittsburg, Illinois, in Williamson County
Pittsburg, Indiana, an unincorporated community
Hymera, Indiana, originally named Pittsburg
Pittsburg, Montgomery County, Iowa
Pittsburg, Van Buren County, Iowa
Pittsburg, Kentucky
Pittsburg, Michigan
Pittsburg, Mississippi
Pittsburg, Missouri
Pittsburg, Nebraska, a former town
Pittsburg, Nevada, a ghost town
Pittsburg, New Mexico, a ghost town
Pittsburg, North Carolina
Pitsburg, Ohio
Pittsburg, Oregon
Pittsburg, Lancaster County, Pennsylvania
Pittsburg, South Carolina
Pittsburg Landing, Tennessee
Pittsburg Landing, Idaho
West Pittsburg, Pennsylvania

Canada
Pittsburg Island, Ontario, an island of Ontario

Transportation
Antioch–Pittsburg station, Antioch, California, United States
Pittsburg/Bay Point station, Pittsburg, California
Pittsburg Center station, Pittsburg, California
West Pittsburg station, former train station and proposed museum in West Pittsburg, Pennsylvania

Other uses
Pittsburg (Hasidic dynasty) founded in Pittsburgh, PA, U.S.
Pittsburg State University, a public university located in Pittsburg, Kansas

See also
West Pittsburg (disambiguation)
Pittsboro (disambiguation)
Pittsburgh, the city in Pennsylvania
Pittsburgh (disambiguation)